Early general elections were held in Trinidad and Tobago on 6 November 1995, after the ruling People's National Movement had seen its majority reduced to a single seat due to a defection and a lost by-election. The results saw the PNM and the United National Congress both won 17 seats. Although they had received fewer votes, the UNC was able to form a coalition with the two-seat National Alliance for Reconstruction, allowing UNC leader Basdeo Panday to become the country's first Prime Minister of Indian descent. Voter turnout was 63.3%.

Results

References

Trinidad
Elections in Trinidad and Tobago
1995 in Trinidad and Tobago